Hernando Siles Reyes (5 August 1882 – 23 November 1942) was a Bolivian politician who served as the 31st president of Bolivia from 1926 to 1930. The founder of the Nationalist Party, he soon gravitated toward the Saavedrista faction of the Republican Party, which had come to power in 1920. Chosen by President Saavedra to be his successor in 1926, Siles ran on a ticket that included the latter's brother, Abdon Saavedra, as his vice-presidential running mate. This formula won the elections, and Siles Reyes was sworn in August, 1926. Soon, he came to be regarded as one of the most charismatic Bolivian politicians in recent memory, especially when he broke openly with the domineering ex-President Bautista Saavedra, and exiled him along with his brother (hitherto Siles's own Vice-President). Despite all this, the Siles government soon ran into economic and political difficulties associated with the far-reaching effects of the "crash" of 1929. Moreover, his term was marked by rising diplomatic tensions with neighboring Paraguay which would later lead to the Chaco War. Many more opponents were exiled, giving Siles some breathing room, but matters reached a breaking point when, in 1930, the President attempted to unilaterally increase his term in office, ostensibly to deal with the mounting economic and international crisis. This was all his opponents needed, and with a coup d'état clearly in the offing, Siles resigned on May 28, 1930, leaving his cabinet in charge. The latter was overthrown by General Carlos Blanco, who in 1931 called elections which were won by Daniel Salamanca of the Partido Republicano-Genuino. Siles lived the rest of his life in exile, dying in Lima in 1942 at the age of 60.

Hernando Siles' older son, Hernán Siles Zuazo, became himself Constitutional President of Bolivia, ruling from 1956 to 1960, and again from 1982 to 1985. His younger son Luis Adolfo Siles Salinas was acting President of Bolivia for a few months in 1969.

References

1882 births
1942 deaths
20th-century Bolivian lawyers
20th-century Bolivian politicians
Ambassadors of Bolivia to Peru
Bolivian expatriates in Peru
Candidates in the December 1925 Bolivian presidential election
Defense ministers of Bolivia
Education ministers of Bolivia
Government ministers of Bolivia
Members of the Chamber of Deputies (Bolivia)
Members of the Senate of Bolivia
Nationalist Party (Bolivia) politicians
People from Sucre
Presidents of Bolivia
Siles family
Socialist Republican Party (Bolivia) politicians
University of Saint Francis Xavier alumni
Rectors of universities in Bolivia